

The Cvjetkovic  CA-61 Mini-Ace is a 1960s American homebuilt monoplane aircraft designed by Anton Cvjetkovic.

Development
Designed by Anton Cvjetkovic for home construction, the CA-61 Mini-Ace is a single-seat wooden low-wing monoplane with a fixed tailwheel undercarriage. It was first flown in 1962. A retractable landing gear version (CA-61R) was also designed to be home-built.

The aircraft is designed to be flown with a Continental A65, however 1600cc Volkswagen engines have been implemented as well. Some builders have installed side opening and open-cockpit variations of windscreens.

One example was built in the attic of a building in Knott's Berry Farm.
The aircraft has an ICAO Type Designator CA61

Variants
CA-61F
Fixed landing gear version for home building
CA-61R
Retractable landing gear version for home building

Specifications (prototype (single seat))

References

Aircraft Specifications
Aircraft World Directory

1960s United States sport aircraft
Homebuilt aircraft
CA61
Low-wing aircraft
Single-engined tractor aircraft
Aircraft first flown in 1962